This is a chronological list of works known to have premiered at the Teatro Capranica in Rome. While the vast majority are operas, the list also includes oratorios, cantatas, and plays. The Capranica was originally built as a private theatre in 1679 and converted into a public theatre in 1694. The theatre was closed from 1699 to 1711 when there was a papal ban on public secular performances in Rome. There were other shorter periods of closure in the 18th and 19th centuries, and it definitively ceased operating as a full-scale theatre and opera house in 1881. In a much altered state, it now serves as a conference and event venue.

Premieres

17th century

Bernardo Pasquini's Dov'è amore è pietà; opera (dramma per musica); libretto by Cristoforo Ivanovich; 6 January 1679
Alessandro Scarlatti's Gli equivoci nel sembiante ovvero L'errore innocente; opera (dramma pastorale) in 3 acts; libretto by Domenico Filippo Contini; 5 February 1679 (first public performance)
Bernardo Pasquini's L'Idalma, overo Chi la dura la vince; opera (commedia per musica); libretto by Giuseppe Domenico de Totis; 6 February 1680
Francesco Gasparini's Amor vince lo sdegno ovvero L'Olimpia placata; opera (dramma per musica) in 3 acts; libretto by Aurelio Aureli; 9 February 1692
Alessandro Scarlatti's Il nemico di se stesso; opera (dramma per musica) in three acts; libretto anonymous; 24 January 1693
Alessandro Scarlatti's La Teodora Augusta (revised version), opera (dramma per musica) in 3 acts; libretto by Adriano Morselli; 4 January 1693
Lulier, Gaffi, and Cesarini's Clearco in Negroponte, opera (dramma per musica) in 3 acts; libretto by Novello de Bonis; 18 January 1695
Alessandro Scarlatti's Il Flavio Cuniberto; opera (dramma per musica) in 3 acts; libretto by Matteo Noris; Carnival season, 1696
Bernardo Sabadini's L'Eusonia overo La dama stravagante; opera (dramma per musica) in 3 acts; libretto by Matteo Noris, Carnival season, 1697

18th century

Antonio Caldara's Tito e Berenice; opera (dramma per musica) in 3 acts; libretto Carlo Sigismondo Capece; 10 January 1714
Francesco Gasparini's Lucio Papirio; opera (dramma per musica) in 3 acts; libretto by Antonio Salvi; 27 January 1714
Alessandro Scarlatti's Telemaco; opera (dramma per musica) in 3 acts; libretto by Carlo Sigismondo Capece; Carnival season, 1718
Alessandro Scarlatti's Talor per suo diletto; cantata, 28 April 1718,
Alessandro Scarlatti's Su la sponda fiorita di limpido ruscello; cantata; 20 August 1718
Alessandro Scarlatti's Marco Attilio Regolo; opera (dramma per musica) in 3 acts; libretto by Matteo Noris; Carnival season, 1719
Alessandro Scarlatti's  La gloriosa gara tra la Santità e la Sapienza; oratorio; 13 June 1720
Alessandro Scarlatti's  Matilde, alma mia, se udiste mai; cantata; 3 July 1720
Alessandro Scarlatti's Benedicta et venerabilis es; motet for 4 voices and strings; 4 July 1720
Alessandro Scarlatti's  Regie soglie, alte moli; cantata; 18 October 1720
Alessandro Scarlatti's Non più contrasti, no; cantata; 6 October 1721
Alessandro Scarlatti's Dolce sonno, oblio dei malicantata; cantata; 16 November 1721
Alessandro Scarlatti's Griselda; opera (dramma per musica) in 3 acts; libretto by Francesco Maria Ruspoli; January, 1721
Giuseppe Maria Orlandini's Nino; opera (dramma per musica) in 3 acts; libretto by Ippolito Zanelli; 7 January 1722
Benedetto Micheli's Oreste; opera (dramma per musica) in 3 acts; libretto by Giovanni Gualberto Barlocci; 28 December 1722
Antonio Vivaldi's Ercole su'l Termodonte; opera (dramma per musica) in 3 acts; libretto by Giacomo Francesco Bussani; 23 January 1723
Tommaso Redi's In passioni Domini; cantata; 23 March 1723
Antonio Vivaldi's Giustino; opera (dramma per musica) in 3 acts; libretto by Nicolò Beregan; Carnival season, 1724
Leonardo Leo's Il trionfo di Camilla, regina dei Volsci; opera (dramma per musica) in 3 acts; libretto by Silvio Stampiglia; 8 January 1726
Tomaso Albinoni's La Statira; opera (dramma per musica) in 3 acts; libretto by Apostolo Zeno and Pietro Pariati; Carnival season, 1726
Tommaso Albinoni's Malsazio e Fiammetta opera (intermezzo); libretto anonymous; (premiered with La Statira) Carnival season, 1726 
Giovanni Battista Costanzi's L'amor generoso; opera (dramma per musica) in 3 acts; libretto by Giuseppe Polvini after Apostolo Zeno; 7 January 1727
Leonardo Leo's Il Cid; opera (dramma per musica) in 3 acts; libretto by Giovanni Giacomo Alborghetti, 10 February 1727 
Riccardo Broschi's L'isola di Alcina; opera (dramma per musica) in 3 acts; libretto by Antonio Fanzaglia; 31 January 1728
Giovanni Fischietti's La costanza; opera (commedia per musica) in 3 acts; libretto by Bernardo Saddumene; 7 February 1729
Nicola Porpora's  Mitridate (2° version); opera (dramma per musica) in 3 acts; libretto by Filippo Vanstryp; 7 January 1730
Michele Caballone's Adone re di Cipro; opera (dramma per musica) in 3 acts; libretto by Filippo Vanstryp; 8 December 1730
Geminiano Giacomelli's Annibale; opera (dramma per musica) in 3 acts; libretto by Filippo Vanstrypp; 27 January 1731
 Johann Adolph Hasse's Cajo Fabricio; opera (dramma per musica) in 3 acts; libretto by Filippo Vanstryp; 12 January 1732
Giuseppe Scarlatti's La Santissima Vergine Annunziata; oratorio; 12 March 1739
Giuseppe Scarlatti's Merope; opera (dramma per musica) in 3 acts; libretto by Apostolo Zeno; 23 January 1740
Giuseppe Sellitto's Sesostri, re d'Egitto opera (dramma per musica) in 3 acts; libretto by Pietro Pariati after Apostolo Zeno; 2 January 1742
Giuseppe Arena and Giuseppe Sellitto's  Farnace, opera (dramma per musica) in 3 acts; libretto by Antonio Maria Lucchini; 23 January 1742
Nicola Conti's  Berenice; opera (dramma per musica) in 3 acts; libretto by Bartolomeo Vitturi; 7 January 1743
Rinaldo di Capua's Turno Heredonio Aricino; opera (dramma per musica) in 3 acts; libretto by Silvio Stampiglia after Metastasio; 11 December 1743
Baldassarre Galuppi's  Evergete; opera (dramma per musica) in 3 acts; libretto by Francesco Silvani and Giovanni Boldini; 2 January 1747
Gaetano Latilla's Catone in Utica; opera (dramma per musica) in 3 acts; libretto by Metastasio;  30 January 1747
Antonio Gaetano Pampani's Eurione; opera (opera seria) in 3 acts; libretto by Antonio Papi 8 January 1754
Giuseppe Scolari's Cajo Fabricio; opera (dramma per musica) in 3 acts; libretto by Apostolo Zeno; 2 January 1755
Gaetano Latilla's Tito Manlio; opera (dramma per musica) in 3 acts; libretto by  Gaetano Roccaforte; 22 January 1755
Baldassarre Galuppi's La cantarina; opera (farsetta); libretto by Carlo Goldoni; 26 February 1756
Antonio Sacchini and Giacomo Insanguine's Il monte Testaccio; opera (intermezzi); libretto by Carlo Goldoni; (performed with Goldoni's play La moglie saggia) 8 January 1760
Carlo Goldoni's Pamela maritata; play (prose comedy) in 3 acts; February 1760
Antonio Sacchini's La vendemmia; opera (intermezzo); libretto by Carlo Goldoni; 2 February 1760
Niccolò Piccinni's  Il barone di Torreforte; opera (intermezzo farsetta) in 2 acts; libretto anonymous; 10 January 1765
 Niccolò Piccinni's  La pescatrice ovvero L'erede riconosciuta; opera (intermezzo farsetta) in 2 acts; libretto by Carlo Goldoni; 9 January 1766
Niccolò Piccinni's La baronessa di Montecupo; opera (intermezzo farsetta);  libretto anonymous; 27 January 1766
Niccolò Piccinni's  La donna di spirito; opera (commedia in musica in 3 acts; libretto by Marcello Bernardini after Goldoni; 13 February 1770
Alessandro Felici's La donna di spirito; opera (farsetta) in 1 act, libretto by Marcello Bernardini; (premiered with Piccinni's La donna di spirito)  13 February 1770
Giovanni Paisiello's Semiramide in villa; opera (intermezzo) in 2 acts; libretto anonymous (parody of Metastasio's Semiramide riconosciuta); Carnival season, 1772
Giuseppe Gazzaniga's  La finta folletto o Lo spirito folletto; opera (opera buffa) in 2 acts; libretto anonymous; 29 December 1778
Gaetano Monti's La contadina accorta opera (intermezzo) in 2 acts; 4 January 1781
Angelo Tarchi's Le cose d'oggi giorno divise in trenta tomi, tomo primo, parte prima; opera (intermezzo); libretto anonymous; 26 December 1784
Vincenzo Fabrizi's La sposa invisibile; opera (farsetta); libretto anonymous; 20 February 1786
Vincenzo Fabrizi's La nobiltà villana; opera (opera buffa); libretto anonymous; 30 January 1787
Valentino Fioravanti's  Il fabbro parigino o sia La schiava fortunata; opera (opera buffa) in 2 acts; libretto by Luigi Romanelli; 9 January 1789
Valentino Fioravanti's  La famiglia stravagante; opera (opera buffa) in 2 acts; libretto by Giuseppe Petrosellini; 3 February 1792
Valentino Fioravanti's  La cantatrice bizarra; opera (opera buffa) in 2 acts; libretto anonymous; 26 December 1795

References
Notes

Sources

Della Corte, Andrea (1936). "Scarlatti, Alessandro", Enciclopedia italiana, Vol. 31. Treccani. Online version retrieved 20 January 2014 .
Franchi, Saverio and Sartori, Orietta  (1997). Drammaturgia romana, Vol. 2. Edizioni di Storia e Letteratura.  
Goldoni, Carlo (1829). Raccolta completa delle commedie di Carlo Goldoni, Vol. 15. Società editrice (Firenze) 
Harper, John and Lindgren, Lowell (2001). "Pasquini, Bernardo". Grove Music Online. Retrieved 23 January 2014 
Libby, Dennis et al. (2001). "Piccinni". The New Grove Dictionary of Music and Musicians, 2nd edition, Vol. 19. 
Lungi, Angelo (1772). L' Americano, intermezzi per musica a quattro voci da rappresentarsi nel Teatro alla Valle degl'illustrissimi sig. Capranica nel carnevale dell'anno 1772. Catalog of the Servizio Bibliotecario Nazionale. Retrieved 24 January 2014 .  
Natuzzi, Elisabetta (1999). Il Teatro Capranica dall'inaugurazione al 1881. Edizioni Scientifiche Italiane. 
Polzonetti, Pierpaolo (2001). Italian Opera in the Age of the American Revolution. Cambridge University Press. 
Robinson, Michael F. (2001). "Paisiello, Giovanni". Grove Music Online. Retrieved 23 January 2014 
Strohm, Reinhard (2008). Essays on Handel and Italian Opera. Cambridge University Press. 

Opera-related lists
Rome-related lists